CJ Walker (born March 24, 1997) is an American professional basketball player for Phoenix Hagen of the German ProA. He played college basketball for the Florida State Seminoles and the Ohio State Buckeyes.

Early life and high school career
Walker was raised in Indianapolis, Indiana and attended Arsenal Technical High School in Indianapolis. During his senior season, he won the Indianapolis Coaches Association Player of the Year. His senior season averages were 24.3 points, 5.6 assists and three steals per game.

Recruiting
Walker committed to Florida State on June 20, 2015 over offers from Walker's future head coach at Ohio State Chris Holtmann at Butler, Illinois, and Cincinnati.

College career

Florida State
Walker played in 33 games off the bench during his freshman year, averaging 4.9 points, 1.3 assists, and 0.6 steals per game. His season-high in points during the season was 13, against Illinois and Wake Forest. He started every game except for one during his sophomore season at Florida State, averaging 8 points, 2.4 assists, and 1 steal per game. He started every game of Florida State's Elite Eight run during the 2018 NCAA tournament, averaging 17.5 minutes per game. Following the season, on March 27, 2018, he transferred from Florida State.

Ohio State
Walker committed to Ohio State on April 8, 2018. Walker sat out the 2018–19 season due to NCAA transfer rules. He had a solid season during his junior season, averaging 8.7 points, 3.5 assists, and 1.3 steals per game. He scored a season-high 18 points in a game against Nebraska on January 14, 2020.

Walker missed four games during mid-January due to a nagging hand injury.  In Ohio State's Big Ten tournament championship loss, Walker scored 16 points and made a buzzer-beating three-pointer, although the three-pointer did not affect the result of the game as Illinois won the game by three points. He averaged 9.5 points, 4.4 assists, and 0.9 steals per game. His free throw percentage of 94.0% ranked second in the country.

Walker declared for the 2021 NBA draft on April 12, 2021, forgoing his option to return to college by hiring an agent.

Professional career
On August 13, 2021, Walker signed his first professional contract with ETHA Engomis of the Cyprus Basketball Division A. However he parted ways with the team before playing a game. On September 27, Walker signed with Phoenix Hagen of the German ProA.

Career statistics

College

|-
| style="text-align:left;"| 2016–17
| style="text-align:left;"| Florida State
| 33 || 0 || 12.5 || .397 || .304 || .655 || 1.4 || 1.3 || .6 || .1 || 4.9
|-
| style="text-align:left;"| 2017–18
| style="text-align:left;"| Florida State
| 35 || 34 || 23.2 || .412 || .355 || .732 || 2.5 || 2.4 || 1.0 || .1 || 8.0
|-
| style="text-align:left;"| 2018–19
| style="text-align:left;"| Ohio State
| style="text-align:center;" colspan="11"|  Redshirt
|-
| style="text-align:left;"| 2019–20
| style="text-align:left;"| Ohio State
| 31 || 29 || 29.0 || .427 || .321 || .812 || 3.1 || 3.5 || 1.3 || .1 || 8.7
|-
| style="text-align:left;"| 2020–21
| style="text-align:left;"| Ohio State
| 27 || 12 || 30.0 || .410 || .265 || .940 || 3.2 || 4.4 || .9 || .1 || 9.5
|- class="sortbottom"
| style="text-align:center;" colspan="2"| Career
| 126 || 75 || 23.3 || .413 || .321 || .799 || 2.5 || 2.8 || .9 || .1 || 7.7

Personal life
Walker and his girlfriend, Heather Battle, had a daughter, Summer, in 2019.

References

External links
Ohio State Buckeyes bio
Florida State Seminoles bio

1997 births
Living people
21st-century African-American sportspeople
African-American basketball players
American men's basketball players
Basketball players from Indianapolis
Florida State Seminoles men's basketball players
Ohio State Buckeyes men's basketball players
Phoenix Hagen players